Mason is a traditionally masculine given name, although recently the name has been used for either sex. Its origin is from the occupational surname Mason, which means "one who works with stone".

The popularity of the given name has risen in recent years, becoming the second most popular name given to boys in the United States in 2011.

List of people with this given name

Academics
 Mason Durie, New Zealand professor of psychiatry and research academic
 Mason Gaffney, American economist
 Mason Welch Gross, American television quiz show personality and academic
 Mason Hammond, Harvard University professor, authority on Latin and the history of Rome
 Mason Peck, NASA Chief Technologist, and an associate professor at Cornell University

Art
 Mason Chamberlin, English portrait painter and one of the founding members of the Royal Academy
 Mason Mastroianni, American comic artist

Film and television
 Mason Adams, American character actor and voice-over artist
 Mason Cook, American child actor
 Mason Dye, American actor
 Mason Gamble, American actor
 Mason Kayne, English actor
 Mason Alexander Park, American actor and singer 
 Mason Reese, former child actor
 Mason Shefa, American filmmaker

Music
 Mason Bates, American composer of symphonic music
 Mason Daring, American musician and composer of scores for film and television
 Mason Durell Betha ("Mase"), American rapper
 Mason Jennings, American pop-folk singer-songwriter
 Mason Lindahl, American guitarist and songwriter
 Mason Musso, American singer-songwriter and musician
 Mason Neely, American-born record producer, drummer, orchestral arranger and multi-instrumentalist
 Mason Ramsey, American-born country music singer
 Mason Williams, American guitarist
 Mason Noise, finalist on The X Factor (British series 12)

Military
 Mason Carter, a U.S. Army officer of the American Civil War and the Indian Wars during the late 19th century
 Mason Patrick, U.S. Army general and air power advocate

Physicians
 Mason Andrews, American physician known for delivering the world's 15th in vitro baby
 Mason Fitch Cogswell, American physician

Politics
 Mason Cook Darling, U.S. Representative from Wisconsin
 Mason S. Peters, U.S. Representative from Kansas
 Mason S. Stone, Vermont educator and politician
 Mason Sears, American politician
 Mason Tappan, American politician

Sports
 Mason Aguirre, American snowboarder
 Mason B. Thomas, American football coach
 Mason Bennett, English footballer
 Mason Cole (born 1996), American football player
 Mason Cox (born 1991), American player of Australian rules football
 Mason Crane (born 1997), English cricketer
 Mason Crosby, American football player
 Mason Fine (born 1997), American football player
 Mason Finley, American shot putter and discus thrower
 Mason Foster, American football player
 Mason Greenwood (born 2001), English footballer
 Mason Massey (born 1997), American racing driver
 Mason McTavish, Swiss professional ice hockey player
 Mason Mount, English footballer
 Mason Phelps, American golfer who competed in the 1904 Summer Olympics
 Mason Plumlee, (born 1990), American basketball player
 Mason Raige, American professional wrestler
 Mason Raymond, Canadian professional ice hockey player
 Mason Rocca, Italian-American professional basketball player
 Mason Rudolph (golfer), American professional golfer
 Mason Rudolph (American football) (born 1995), American football player
 Mason Ryan, Welsh professional wrestler
 Mason Schreck (born 1993), American football player
 Mason Scott, English international rugby union player
 Mason Tobin, American professional baseball player
 Mason Trafford, American-born Canadian soccer player
 Mason Unck, American football player
 Mason Walters, American football player
 Mason Webb, American soccer player
 Mason Williams, American professional baseball player

Other
 Mason, a character in the 1992 TV comedy Revenge of the Nerds III
 Mason Brayman, American attorney, newspaperman, and military officer
 Mason Cooley, American aphorist
 Mason Jackson, English engraver
 Mason Malmuth, American poker player
 Mason Pines, also known as Dipper, the main character of the Disney XD animated series Gravity Falls.
 Mason Strode, in the Halloween film series
 Mason Weaver, the female protagonist of the film, Kong: Skull Island, played by Brie Larson

References

See also 
Mason (disambiguation)
Mason (surname)

English masculine given names
English feminine given names
English unisex given names
English-language unisex given names
Feminine given names
Masculine given names